The Boyer South River (in French: rivière Boyer Sud) is a tributary of the Boyer River, which flows northeast and empties on the south shore of the St. Lawrence River. The South Boyer River crosses the municipalities of Honfleur, Saint-Gervais, Saint-Henri and Saint-Charles-de-Bellechasse, in the Bellechasse Regional County Municipality, in the administrative region of Chaudière-Appalaches, in Quebec, in Canada.

Geography 
The main neighboring watersheds of the South Boyer River are:
 north side: Boyer North River, Boyer River, rivière à la Scie, St. Lawrence River;
 east side: Boyer River, Leblond stream, Bras Saint-Michel, rivière du Moulin (Bras Saint-Michel);
 south side: Etchemin River, Boyer North River;
 west side: Etchemin River.

The Boyer Sud river has its source in an agricultural zone on the north side of the village of Honfleur, in the 3e rang East, between the third rang East road and the path "la Petite 3e".

  north into Honfleur, to the limit of Saint-Gervais;
  north, up to chemin du 2e rang West;
  west, then north-west, to chemin du 1er rang West;
  westward, up to the limit of Saint-Gervais and Saint-Henri;
  north, to Chemin de la Grande-Grillade;
  northeasterly, up to Chemin Saint-Félix which forms the boundary between Saint-Henri and Saint-Charles-de-Bellechasse;
  northeasterly, to its confluence with the Boyer North River, which constitutes the head of the Boyer River.

The confluence of the Boyer South river is located on the northwest side of rang Sud-Ouest road, in Saint-Charles-de-Bellechasse.

Toponymy 
The toponym Rivière Boyer Sud was formalized on December 5, 1968, at the Commission de toponymie du Québec.

References

See also 

 List of rivers of Quebec

Rivers of Chaudière-Appalaches
Bellechasse Regional County Municipality